Austin Agustín Santos (born December 23, 1985), better known by his stage name Arcángel, is an American rapper, singer and songwriter. He was born in New York City to Dominican parents. In 2002, he was interested in becoming a performer of reggaeton, a contemporary Latin American urban music genre. While living in Puerto Rico, he eventually formed part of a popular then-underground reggaeton act, Arcángel & De La Ghetto. The duo went on to make songs that became popular among reggaeton fans in the United States and Puerto Rico, including "Agresivo", "Sorpresa" and "Mi Fanática" during the mid-2000s.

Arcángel went on to release his debut studio album, El Fenómeno, in late 2008. The album included songs that were produced in 2008, as well as the DJ Nelson produced "Chica Virtual", which was produced in 2007 by DJ Nelson and part of the producers album Flow la Discoteka 2. Half of the album also included newly produced tracks, ones including "Pa' Que la Pases Bien" and "Por Amar a Ciegas", which went on to become successful airplay songs on American Latin Urban radio stations across the United States.

Early life 
Arcángel was born in New York City to Dominican parents. He and his family moved to Puerto Rico after turning 12, and then began moving back and forth between New York City and Puerto Rico. He grew up in Villa Palmeras, Santurce, Puerto Rico. His mother, Carmen Rosa, was a former member of the all-women merengue group, las Chicas del Can, who were popular during the mid 1980s to the early 1990s. Arcángel grew up listening to various types of music and has been a fan of rock music, particularly Draco Rosa, a Puerto Rican pop rock artist and a former member of Menudo. Arcángel was not always a fan of reggaeton; he claims that it is not his favorite type of music, but it is easy to sing to. During the early 2000s, Arcángel grew fond of the new kind of music. Listening to artists like Tego Calderón and Tempo, it inspired him to pursue a rapping career in Puerto Rico.  In November 2021, Arcángel's younger brother died in a car accident while on a visit to Puerto Rico.

Music career

2004–2007: Career beginnings with De La Ghetto 

After returning to Puerto Rico in 2002, Arcángel had decided to follow in the footsteps of the upbringing of reggaeton music. He went on to form part of an underground reggaeton act, Arcángel & De La Ghetto. The duo was signed to reggaeton artist Zion's record label, Baby Records, a subsidiary of Universal Music Group. The duo were also involved with Machete Music in 2004 during the time that they were recording for reggaeton compilation albums. Arcángel & De La Ghetto rose to fame in 2006 on the reggaeton compilation album hosted by Héctor el Father, Sangre Nueva, with their hit song, "Ven Pégate". They were also featured on the Luny Tunes-hosted compilation Mas Flow: Los Benjamins in 2006.

Though an active musical duo, Arcángel & De La Ghetto never released a studio album since the formation of the duo. Any production they had been involved with only resulted in tracks and recordings being included on compilation albums or leaked onto the Internet. This was due to a conflict with Baby Records because the company was not releasing any material by Arcángel & De La Ghetto onto an album of their own. Arcángel claimed to have even spent $150,000 on producing an album, which resulted in the label not releasing it to market. The tracks produced were said to have been leaked onto the Internet instead. Arcángel had then filed a lawsuit with Baby Records in 2007 for US$1,000,000 and eventually left the record company in December 2006, when he announced that he was embarking on a solo career and founding a label of his own.

2008–present: Solo career and debut album 
After the separation of the duo in early 2007, Arcángel went on to perform solo, working with various reggaeton producers and performers on compilation albums. Most notable of them was a compilation album produced in 2007, Flow la Discoteka 2, which was produced by songwriter and record producer DJ Nelson. The album was an upbringing of different artists trying to rise to fame, one of those including Arcángel, who made a track titled "Chica Virtual", which went on to be one of his most recognizable songs, as well as being a popular airplay single on American Latin Urban radio stations, charting at number 9 on the Billboard Latin Rhythm Airplay chart. It also charted at number 22 on the Billboard Hot Latin Tracks chart.

Since the departure in early 2008, nevertheless, the decision to release the album was cancelled due to the album being leaked onto the Internet during spring 2008. The tracks were distributed through his official website and file sharing sites relating to reggaeton under the title La Maravilla. One of the internet leaks, a song titled "Pa' Que la Pases Bien", went on to be a popular airplay track on American Latin Urban radio stations across the United States. The unreleased album being leaked onto the internet resulted in making Arcángel more popular among reggaeton fans in the United States, as well as Puerto Rico.

Arcángel founded Flow Factory Inc. in 2006, and his mother became his manager afterward. He claimed that it was easier having his mother be his manager so that he would not have to pay 20 percent of money received from record sales to his record label and manager. He went on to release his debut album, El Fenómeno, in late 2008. The album included songs that were produced in the last quarter of 2007 and the first quarter of 2008, including the DJ Nelson produced "Chica Virtual". Half of the album was tracks that he originally produced for an album that was to be released in the first quarter of 2008. The other half of the album also included newly produced tracks, ones including "Por Amar a Ciegas", which went on to become a successful airplay single on Latin urban radio stations across the United States.

In mid-January 2009, Arcángel announced plans of a European tour sometime during 2009, in promotion of his debut album, El Fenómeno, and to receive more exposure across the world from reggaeton fans. To comment on the tour, he claimed that in order for it to be successful, good equipment would be highly important, and by going on the tour, he would be able to learn more about a continental tour experience. Arcángel confirmed to be touring in several countries, including Germany, France, Portugal, Spain, England, the Netherlands and Denmark. His mixtape The Problem Child was released in April 2010, with his following mixtape Optimus A.R.C.A. released in October 2010.

On February 28, 2012, Pina Records issued a newsletter informing that Arcángel had signed with the label, becoming the latest addition to the Pina Records team called "La Fórmula". Pina Records is based in San Juan, Puerto Rico and operates offices in Colombia and Venezuela. Through the label, Arcángel released his 2013 album Sentimiento, Elegancia & Maldad.

Legal issues 
In 2012, he was arrested in San Juan, Puerto Rico, for driving under the influence of alcohol and speeding. In 2019, Arcángel got into legal trouble for domestic battery and was set to appear in court in June 2020.

Discography

Studio albums 
 El Fenómeno (2008)
 Sentimiento, Elegancia & Maldad (2013)
 Los Favoritos (2015) with DJ Luian
 Ares (2018)
 Historias de un Capricornio (2019)
 Los Favoritos 2 (2020)
 Los Favoritos 2.5 (2021)
 Sr. Santos (2022)

Mixtapes 
 The Problem Child (2010)
 Optimus A.R.C.A. (2010)

References

External links 
 
 

1985 births
Living people
American hip hop singers
American reggaeton musicians
American singers of Dominican Republic descent
Latin trap musicians
People from East Harlem
Puerto Rican people of Dominican Republic descent
Puerto Rican reggaeton musicians
Singers from New York City
Songwriters from New York (state)
Spanish-language singers of the United States
21st-century American singers
Latin music songwriters
Machete Music artists
Universal Music Latino artists
Sony Music Latin artists